is a passenger railway station in located in the town of Nachikatsuura, Higashimuro District, Wakayama Prefecture, Japan, operated by West Japan Railway Company (JR West).

Lines

Station layout
The station consists of one island platform connected go the station building by a level crossing. The station is unattended.

Platforms

Adjacent stations

|-
!colspan=5|West Japan Railway Company (JR West)

History
Kii-Uragami Station opened on December 11, 1936. With the privatization of the Japan National Railways (JNR) on April 1, 1987, the station came under the aegis of the West Japan Railway Company.

Passenger statistics
In fiscal 2019, the station was used by an average of 9 passengers daily (boarding passengers only).

Surrounding Area
 Tamanoura fishing village
 Japan National Route 42

See also
List of railway stations in Japan

References

External links

 Kii-Uragami Station (West Japan Railway) 

Railway stations in Wakayama Prefecture
Railway stations in Japan opened in 1936
Nachikatsuura